Leyla Bouzid (born 1984 in Tunis), is a Tunisian screenwriter and film director.

Early life and education 
Born in Tunis in 1984, Bouzid is the daughter of the director Nouri Bouzid. She grew up in Tunisia, spending her adolescence in Tunis. After her baccalaureate, she moved to Paris to study literature at the Sorbonne. After achieving a first short film, Bonjour (Sbah el khir el), she completed her studies at La Fémis.

Bouzid short film Twitching was her graduation film for La Fémis; it was shot in Tunisia.

In 2012, Twitching screened in a competition at the Clermont-Ferrand International Short Film Festival, where it was well received. It also won the Grand Jury Prize of student films at the Festival Premiers Plans d'Angers.

Career
In 2013, Zakaria was Bouzid's first produced short film.

In 2015, her feature film, As I Open My Eyes, was selected for several festivals. It won acclaim at events like the Venice Film Festival, the Carthage Film Festival, the International Festival of Young Filmmakers of Saint-Jean-de-Luz, the Festival International du Film Francophone de Namur, and the International Film Festival of Dubai.

As I Open My Eyes investigates the modern Tunisian identity through focusing on a young woman's personal relationships during the political instability in the months before the Tunisian Revolution. The film marries the private life of a young Tunisian woman with the story of her nation at the cusp of fundamental change; "the young female body of Farah, with her voice and gaze, plays a pivotal role in how the movie is intensely meandering between the political and the nonpolitical."

Filmography 
 2006 : Bonjour (Sbah el khir), court métrage en tant que co-réalisatrice et co-scénariste ;
 2010 : Un Ange passe, court métrage en tant que réalisatrice et co-scénariste (film de troisième année) ;
 2010 : Condamnation, court métrage réalisé par Walid Mattar en tant que co-scénariste ;
 2011 : Soubresauts, court métrage en tant que réalisatrice et co-scénariste (film de fin d'étude) ;
 2012 : Offrande, court métrage réalisé par Walid Mattar en tant que co-scénariste ;
 2013 : Zakaria, court métrage en tant que réalisatrice et co-scénariste ;
 2015 : À peine j'ouvre les yeux, long métrage en tant que réalisatrice et co-scénariste avec Marie-Sophie Chambon.
 2021 : A Tale of Love and Desire

Awards and nominations

References

Sources

Bibliography 
 
 .
 .
 
 .
 
 .
 .
 .
 .
 .
 .

External links 
 .

1984 births
Tunisian screenwriters
Living people
Tunisian women film directors
Tunisian film directors